The Five Wounds is the debut novel by Kirstin Valdez Quade, published by W. W. Norton & Company on March 30, 2021. It is an expansion of Quade's short story of the same name, which was first published in The New Yorker and later collected in her debut short story collection, Night at the Fiestas (2015). The Five Holy Wounds suffered by Jesus Christ during the crucifixion is used as a metaphor in the novel.

Premise 
Amadeo Padilla, a struggling alcoholic, lives with his pregnant daughter, Angel, and ailing mother, Yolanda, in Las Penas, New Mexico. He is selected to portray Jesus Christ in the town's annual play which reenacts the Passion of Jesus, and is organized by the Roman Catholic lay group Los Hermanos Penitentes.

Reception 
In a starred review, Publishers Weekly wrote that the "well-developed characters convey palpable emotion" and concluded, "Quade's rendering of a singular community is pitch perfect."

In The New York Times, Alexandra Chang wrote, "Quade has created a world bristling with compassion and humanity. The characters and the challenges they face are wholly realized and moving; their journeys span a wide spectrum of emotion and it is impossible not to root for all three."

The novel was awarded the 2021 Center for Fiction First Novel Prize. It was also shortlisted for the 2022 Andrew Carnegie Medal for Excellence in Fiction. It was named one of the best books of the year by NPR and Publishers Weekly.

References 

2021 American novels
2021 debut novels
Hispanic and Latino American novels
Novels about alcoholism
Novels set in New Mexico
W. W. Norton & Company books
Works originally published in The New Yorker